The 2016–17 Northern Football League season was the 119th in the history of Northern Football League, a football competition in England.

Division One

Division One featured 19 clubs which competed in the division last season, along with three new clubs, promoted from Division Two:
 Chester-le-Street Town
 Ryhope Colliery Welfare
 South Shields

Two teams – Bishop Auckland and South Shields – applied for promotion to step 4 for the 2017–18 season.

League table

Promotion criteria
To be promoted at the end of the season a team must:
 Have applied to be considered for promotion by 30 November 2016	
 Pass a ground grading examination by 31 March 2017	
 Finish the season in a position higher than that of any other team also achieving criteria 1 and 2	
 Finish the season in one of the top three positions
The following two teams have achieved criterion one:
 Bishop Auckland
 South Shields

Division Two

Division Two featured 17 clubs which competed in the division last season, along with five new clubs:
 Bedlington Terriers, relegated from Division One
 Blyth Town, promoted from the Northern Football Alliance
 Durham City, relegated from Division One
 Norton & Stockton Ancients, relegated from Division One
 Stockton Town, promoted from the Wearside League

League table

References

External links
 Northern Football League official site

Northern Football League seasons
9